Austin Walsh (born 1977) is an Irish retired hurler who played as a midfielder for the Cork senior team.

Born in Kildorrery, County Cork, Walsh first arrived on the inter-county scene at the age of sixteen when he first linked up with the Cork minor team, before later joining the under-21 side. He joined the senior panel during the 1998 championship. Walsh won one National Hurling League medal as a non-playing substitute.

At club level Walsh enjoyed a lengthy career with Kildorrery.

Honours

Team

Cork
National Hurling League (1): 1998 (sub)
All-Ireland Intermediate Hurling Championship (1): 1997
Munster Intermediate Hurling Championship (2): 1997
All-Ireland Under-21 Hurling Championship (2): 1997, 1998
Munster Under-21 Hurling Championship (3): 1996 (sub), 1997, 1998
All-Ireland Minor Hurling Championship (1): 1995
Munster Minor Hurling Championship (2): 1994, 1995

References

1977 births
Living people
Kildorrery hurlers
Cork inter-county hurlers